Prime Boys are a Canadian hip hop collective based in Toronto, Ontario. The original group carnation consists of Jay Whiss, Jimmy Prime and Donnie and the trio released their debut studio album Koba World on July 27, 2018.

Background

The trio all come from the Esplanade area in Toronto's central waterfront district that is popular with tourists, stating that they are showing the sides of the city tourists don't see with their music. It is said that Prime boys member, Jimmy, coined the term "The Six" as a nickname for Toronto, after its six boroughs and the area codes 416 and 647. A term that was taken global by Drake and even influenced the name of companies such as 6ixBuzz. Prime, Donnie and Whiss were all childhood friends who naturally formed into Prime Boys.

The group's single "Tinted", which was produced by Murda Beatz, was featured on Spotify's Northern Bars playlist.

The group released their debut studio album on July 27, 2018. The album was originally slated to be titled Prime Forever but was renamed to Koba World as a dedication to their best friend, Kosi Modekwe aka Koba Prime, who was killed earlier in the year with Halal Gang member Smoke Dawg. The album received a 9/10 score by Exclaim! and was heavily produced by Murda Beatz. It was supported by the singles "Hold Me Down," "Sopranos," "Tinted" and "Come Wit It". Jay Whiss and Jimmy Prime made an appearance on 6ixBuzz's second release NorthernSound released on December 13, 2019, alongside Halal Gang musician Safe on track 13 "The World is Yours".

Prime Boys also come together with all the Halal Gang members to form the hip hop supergroup "Full Circle". Jay Whiss released his debut studio album Peace of Mind on March 3, 2020. It contained features from Puffy L'z, and fellow Prime members Donnie and Jimmy Prime. It contained production from Toronto natives Murda Beatz, Richie Souf and CuBeatz.

Discography

Studio albums 
 Koba World

Compilation albums
 Northern Sound (by 6ixBuzz)

Filmography

References

Black Canadian musical groups
Canadian hip hop groups
Hip hop collectives
Musical groups from Toronto
Musical groups established in 2015
2015 establishments in Ontario